The South Fork Salmon River is a  river in Siskiyou County, California and is the larger of two tributaries that join to form the Salmon River, the other being the North Fork.

See also
List of rivers of California

References

Rivers of Siskiyou County, California
Wild and Scenic Rivers of the United States